Theatrhythm Final Fantasy is a rhythm video game, developed by indieszero and published by Square Enix for Nintendo 3DS and iOS. Based on the Final Fantasy video game franchise, the game involves using the touch screen in time to various pieces of music from the series. The game was released in Japan in February 2012, and in North America, Australia and Europe in July 2012. An iOS version was released in December 2012. A sequel, Theatrhythm Final Fantasy: Curtain Call, was released in 2014. A third game based on the Dragon Quest series, Theatrhythm Dragon Quest, was released in 2015. An arcade game, Theatrhythm Final Fantasy: All-Star Carnival, was released in 2016. A second sequel, Theatrhythm Final Bar Line, was announced on September 13, 2022 for the Nintendo Switch and PlayStation 4, released on February 16, 2023.

Gameplay

Theatrhythm Final Fantasy is a rhythm video game. Players take control of four Final Fantasy characters, and select a Final Fantasy game from the first Final Fantasy to Final Fantasy XIII. Each game has three stages: field, battle, and event. Each stage features different game mechanics than the others; once a stage is completed, the characters level up. The difficulty level can be changed in order to make it appealing to "beginners and rhythm masters alike". Throughout the game, players can unlock music and movie scenes. The gameplay requires players to tap on the screen in correct spots to the beat of the music playing.
Within the main game section "Series Mode", there are 3 unique stage styles: Field (Overworld) Music, Battle Music, and Event (Dramatic) Music, as well as the option to play through the opening and ending themes. 
 The Opening and Ending Theme segments involve simply tapping the screen in time with music notes as they move into the center of a crystal on screen.
 Field music is a side-scrolling rhythm game, as the screen moves from right-to-left, and a player must either tap a note, slide the stylus in a direction, or hold the stylus down while following a waving line on the touch screen. The object is to reach the end of the stage before the music ends, where another character is waiting to give the player an item. Playing well causes the character to speed up, while missing will cause the character to fall down. There is an opportunity to ride a chocobo in each level for a speed boost.
 Battle Music is a mock-battle, with the player tapping notes correctly to do damage to the enemies onscreen. The objective is to kill all the enemies and eventually a boss character during the duration of the song. The notes come in from left-to-right. In this mode, the players must tap a note, swipe the stylus in a direction, or hold the stylus down for a long note. Good timing causes character attacks to be more powerful and can also trigger special abilities. The player has the opportunity to perform one summon attack each battle.
 The Event Music scene includes one or more scenes from the Final Fantasy game you select, and will play the scene onscreen in the background. Controls are similar to the Field sections, albeit players now follow the cursor as it moves around the screen. Clearing gold sections extends the level's song. Characters' stats and abilities other than Hit Points do not affect these stages

There is also a "Challenge Mode" that allows the player to choose the Battle, Overworld, or Dramatic music from a Final Fantasy game that they have cleared the normal difficulty of in Series Mode. The player then plays these one stage at a time, instead of in succession as in Series Mode. If an A rank or better is received on a song, a higher difficulty is unlocked. Unlocking a higher difficulty for all three songs from a Final Fantasy Game will unlock that difficulty in Series Mode. Within Challenge Mode, there is also a "no fail" practice option for each stage.

Lastly for the music section of the game, there is a "Chaos Shrine" mode. There are a total of 99 levels, with two stages per level - a field music followed by a battle music. For each level, there are three possible bosses, with each boss dropping three items for a total of nine potential item drops per level. These items are usually rarer items or crystals needed to unlock additional characters. If one scores high enough in the first field music stage, a sign will appear indicating they will go to "Boss 2 or 3", who will have better item drops. These levels have a difficulty level between the 2nd and 3rd levels from Challenge Mode. Additionally, Chaos Shrine contains songs from Final Fantasy games not featured in other areas of the game (for example, Mambo de Chocobo). The game also features downloadable content, allowing players to purchase new songs and stages from the Nintendo eShop.

Plot
The game follows the events of the gods Chaos and Cosmos, a similar plot to Dissidia Final Fantasy for the PlayStation Portable. The space between the two is called Rhythm, which gives birth to a crystal that controls music. Chaos causes the crystal to become disrupted, and the only way to return it to normal is to increase a music wave known as "Rhythmia" (known as "Rhythpo" in the Japanese version). As such, various characters from the Final Fantasy universe are brought together in order to harness the power of Rhythmia.

Development and release
Theatrhythm Final Fantasy was proposed by Square Enix's Ichiro Hazama after working in the film Final Fantasy VII: Advent Children. It was originally envisioned for the Nintendo DS but development faced difficulties due to the console's limitations. Upon seeing the Nintendo 3DS, Hazama once again gave his idea to his superior Tetsuya Nomura and the company Indieszero, which resulted in the production for the game on the Nintendo 3DS. For the music selection, the Square Enix staff made a music survey during development of Dissidia Final Fantasy although most of the chosen songs were from Final Fantasy VII. All the songs were included in their original versions with the exception of the "Gurugu Volcano" from the first Final Fantasy which is based on the PlayStation release since the original version was shorter. The idea of using the gods Chaos and Cosmos from Dissidia was proposed by Nomura as both Hazama and he had worked in such game and wanted to continue using them.

The trademark "Theatrhythm" was filed near the end of E3 2011 by Square Enix. Theatrhythm Final Fantasy was officially announced for release exclusively on the Nintendo 3DS handheld game console in the Japanese manga anthology Weekly Shōnen Jump. It was originally announced for release only in Japan. Square Enix Japan created an official website to promote the game. Rumours came up that Theatrhythm Final Fantasy would be developed by Jupiter; however, it was later confirmed on the official website that it would be developed by Indieszero. The character and monster designs are designed by MonsterOctopus, who also designed the Kingdom Hearts avatars found in Kingdom Hearts Mobile and Kingdom Hearts Re:Coded.

Reception

In the first week of release in Japan, sales of just shy of 70,000 were reported, despite Famitsu giving the 3DS version a score of one ten, two nines, and one eight for a total of 36 out of 40. Within one month, by March 11, 2012, said handheld version had sold 112,344 copies in Japan. As of February 4, 2013, said version sold 163,098 units in Japan.

In February 2012, Nobuo Uematsu, longtime Final Fantasy composer, played the 3DS version of Theatrhythm Final Fantasy and expressed satisfaction, stating that "As I remembered various things from the past 20 years, I was reduced to tears. FF music fans should definitely play it. Won't you cry with me?"

Elsewhere, the 3DS version received "generally favorable reviews", while the iOS version received "average" reviews, according to the review aggregation website Metacritic.  411Mania gave the 3DS version a score of 8.1 out of 10, saying that the game "was developed with only fans of the series in mind, and it shows. But, when you build a game around music from only one series, that’s to be expected. What FF fans need to know is that the game is fun, and worth picking up for the music alone. Just be prepared to work for some of the top tunes." Digital Spy gave the same handheld version a score of four stars out of five, saying, "While Final Fantasy has lost its way in recent years, Theatrhythm is a warm, wonderful reminder of why you fell in love with the series in the first place. While your mileage will depend on your familiarity with the series, in its own right this is a fun and quirky rhythm game full of neat ideas, but for long-time Final Fantasy fans this is nigh-on essential."  However, the same website gave the iOS version three stars out of five, saying, "The iOS game is much abridged compared to the iOS original. The game starts as a free download with two songs, Final Fantasy VIIs One Winged Angel and Final Fantasy Xs Zanarkand, with the rest of the 59-song soundtrack available as in-app purchases for $0.99 / 69p each."  Anime News Network gave the 3DS version a B, saying, "Not every song in Theatrhythm is a hit, nor is every Final Fantasy, but the moments endure: groups of wizards in the Marsh Cave, Celes singing at the opera, even Tidus and Yuna's infamous laugh-out-loud lakeside sequence."  Slant Magazine, however, gave the same handheld version three-and-a-half stars out of five, stating that "in the face of its minor lapses, Square Enix has constructed an adequate gift to itself and to its followers with Theatrhythm, a magnanimous memento and time capsule to honor one of the greatest and most musically eloquent game series to ever exist."

Sequels

A sequel, Theatrhythm Final Fantasy: Curtain Call, was released for the Nintendo 3DS on April 24, 2014 in Japan, on September 16, 2014 in North America, on September 18, 2014 in Australia, and in Europe the following day. The game features 221 songs and a new versus battle mode. An arcade-based entry in the series, Theatrhythm Final Fantasy: All-Star Carnival, was released in 2016. A second sequel, Theatrhythm Final Bar Line, was announced during a Nintendo Direct presentation on September 13, 2022 for release on February 16, 2023 for Nintendo Switch and PlayStation 4. Final Bar Line is set to include 385 songs from various Final Fantasy main soundtracks and arrangement albums. DLC is planned to add a further 90 songs from additional Square Enix franchises including NieR, The World Ends With You, Chrono Trigger and more.

Notes

References

External links
 Official website (North America)
 Official website (Europe)
 

2012 video games
Final Fantasy video games
IOS games
Music video games
Nintendo 3DS games
Nintendo Network games
Music in fiction
Multiplayer and single-player video games
Square Enix franchises
Video games developed in Japan
Indieszero games